Captain Oliver Loudon Gordon MVO RN (26 Jan 1896 – 30 Jan 1973) was in command of the heavy cruiser  from 11 March 1941 until she was sunk in the Second Battle of the Java Sea on 1 March 1942.

He later wrote of his experiences both in command of the Exeter and as a prisoner of war in Japan in the book Fight It Out, published in 1957.

References

External links
 Oliver Gordon Genealogy page

Royal Navy officers of World War II
World War II prisoners of war held by Japan
Members of the Royal Victorian Order
1896 births
1973 deaths